Petrocosmea rosettifolia is a species of flowering plant in the family Gesneriaceae. A new species Petrocosmea cryptica J.M.H.Shaw was described in 2011, long known in cultivation but mistakenly identified as P. rosettifolia.

Description
The petioles of this species are puberulent and grow to approximately 4 cm. The leaves are sparsely pubescent, and have a broadly ovate to orbicular or broadly elliptic shape. They grow to about 0.5 to 4.0 cm x 0.4 to 0.3 cm.

References

External links
 Image of plant with no flower
 Image of plant with no flower

rosettifolia
Flora of China
House plants